Jacques Gruet (died July 26, 1547) was a poet put to death in Geneva during John Calvin's lifetime in the 16th century.

Family and life
Jacques Gruet was the son of Humbert Gruet, a notary public of Geneva. Humbert died in 1513, and Gruet's mother died after 1522. He also had a sister, Hugonine, who died in 1538. Gruet's business contacts included André Philippe, a noted opponent of Calvin and the son of Jean Philippe, who had been executed in 1540. At the time of his death, Gruet lived in a large house at Place du Bourg-de-Four near Porte du Chastel and St. Pierre Cathedral. 

In Geneva, he was influenced by Ami Perrin and Françoise Favre, and opposed to John Calvin's influence in the city and defied conservative laws in the city. He was suspected of attempting to poison theologian Pierre Viret in 1535 and was once prosecuted for dancing. He was known for his love of wine and for wearing chausses chapplée, a style of trousers that scandalized the city with their shortness. He may have served as a monk earlier in his life.

Prosecution and death
Gruet was seen as a leader of opposition to Calvin's leadership, although he may not have been a member of the main opposition associations, "The Patriots" and the "spirituals". This group included Gruet,  Perrin, the Favre brothers, Claude Franc, François Berthelier, and André Philippe.

On June 27, 1547, a threatening note was found on St. Pierre Cathedral which was believed to have been written by Gruet. The note threatened Calvin and fellow minister Abel Poupin, referring to the recent stabbing of another religious leader, Verli de Fribourg. The next day, Gruel was accused and arrested. Gruet's home was searched and papers were found which showed Gruet's opposition to the religious leaders of the town. Imprisoned for a month, he was tortured and confessed to libeling Calvin, but did not name any accomplices. The day of his death, Gruet was marched from his prison at l'Eveche to the Hôtel de Ville, a route which brought him past his own home. He was beheaded on July 26, 1547.

Burning of Gruet's writings
In 1549, a book with anti-Christian writings by Gruet was found in Gruet's house. While Calvin himself had not taken direct part in Gruet's trial and execution, he was asked what to do about this book, and together with Geneva religious leaders, it was decided that the book should be burned. The public burning took place on May 25, 1550.

References

Sources
Berriot, François. "Un procès d'athéisme à Genève: l'affaire Gruet (1547-1550)." Bulletin de la Société de l'Histoire du Protestantisme Français (1903-) (1979): 577-592.

16th-century births
1547 deaths
Writers from the Republic of Geneva
Executed people from the Republic of Geneva
People executed by decapitation
People executed for heresy